The 2012 New South Wales Swifts season  saw New South Wales Swifts compete in the 2012 ANZ Championship. They were coached by Lisa Beehag, a former Australia international. During the 2011 season, Beehag had served as head coach of NNSW Blues in the Australian Netball League. During the regular season, Swifts finished in fifth place and failed to qualify for the playoffs. They narrowly missed out on the playoffs after a 50–49 defeat to Northern Mystics in their final regular season match.

Players

Player movements

Notes
  Kimberley Borger was named in the 2010 roster but withdrew due to injury.

2012 roster

Player milestones
 Kimberlee Green  and Vanessa Ware  celebrated  ten  consecutive seasons  with Sydney Swifts/New South Wales Swifts. Ware subsequently played her 50th ANZ Championship match in Round 9 against Melbourne Vixens.
 Kimberly Borger, Paige Hadley, April Letton and Joanna Sutton all make their Swifts ANZ Championship debut in Round 1 against Adelaide Thunderbirds
 Susan Pratley scores her 1600th goal in Round 11 against West Coast Fever.

Tauranga Pre-Season Tournament
On 2, 3 and 4 March, Waikato Bay of Plenty Magic hosted a pre-season tournament at the TECT Arena in Tauranga. For the first time since 2008, all ten ANZ Championship teams competed at the same tournament. The ten teams were divided into two pools of five. Teams within each pool played each other once and the winners qualified for the final. Swifts finished the tournament in 8th place.

7th/8th place play-off

Regular season

Fixtures and results
Round 1

Round 2

Round 3

Round 4

Round 5
New South Wales Swifts received a bye.
Round 6

Round 7

Round 8

Round 9

Round 10

Round 11

Round 12

Round 13

Round 14

Final table

Statistics

Award winners

References

New South Wales Swifts seasons
New South Wales Swifts